The Nubian nightjar (Caprimulgus nubicus) is a species of nightjar in the family Caprimulgidae. It is found in Djibouti, Egypt, Eritrea, Ethiopia, Israel, Kenya, Oman, Saudi Arabia, Somalia, Sudan, and Yemen.

Description
The Nubian nightjar is 20–22 cm long. It is a nocturnal species, known for its large eyes and beak, which help it hunt at night. The bird resembles the Moorish nightjar, but is smaller, has a shorter tail and blunt wings compared to the ̺Moorish nightjar. Another characteristic feature is a red-brown band over the neck. The white wing spots are not further away from the wing tips than other types of nightjars.

The Nubian nightjar (Caprimulgus nubicus, Lichtenstein 1823) is the smallest and slightest nightjar in the Western Palearctic (Snow & Perrins, 1998). The species is relatively widespread in the arid part of eastern Africa, though recorded as uncommon and scarce (Perlman, 2008). In the Middle East, it was reported along the Rift Valley in southern Palestine and the Red Sea coast of southern Arabian Peninsula (Birdlife International, 2012).
The bird's former range included the Dead Sea, Aqaba, Fidan Valley, and Tassan, but it is now restricted to Fifa Nature Reserve as a result of habitat destruction (RSCN).

References

 

Nubian nightjar
Birds of East Africa
Birds of the Middle East
Nubian nightjar
Taxonomy articles created by Polbot